Pierre Lacaze (4 May 1934 - 8 July 1995) was a French international rugby player, both union and league. His younger brother, Claude, was also a France rugby union & league international player. He was nicknamed Papillon (Butterfly) and was 1.68 m high and weighed 68 kg.

Rugby 
He took up rugby union with his local Pontacq club, followed by Racing Club de France and lastly FC Lourdes; winning caps for France too. He played as fly-half or as fullback.  

.In 1959, he switched codes to play rugby league, first for Toulouse, then FC Lezignan; also winning international caps for France.

International rugby union career
He won his first test cap against South Africa on 26 July 1958 and his last against Ireland on 18 April 1959. 
He was part of the squad which won against Springboks in South Africa for the first time on 16 August 1958 during a historical tour for the French team.
He replaced a severely injured Michel Vannier as fullback for France.

7 caps
3 drop goals, 1 penalty, 1 conversion, 14 points
Caps per season : 2 in 1958, 5 in 1959
Champion of the 1959 Five Nations Championship

Honours

Rugby union
Frantz Reichel Cup:
Champion (1) : 1954 for Racing
Challenge Yves du Manoir :
Winner (1) : 1956
French Championship First Division :
Champion (3) : 1956, 1957 et 1958
Runner-up (1) : 1955

Rugby league
French Champion for Toulouse Olympique (scoring 26 points during this match) (1965)
Winner of the Lord Derby Cup for FC Lézignan (1970)
Runner-up for Toulouse Olympique (1962, 1963, 1964, 1968) and for FC Lézignan (1971)

References

External links
Pierre Lacaze at rugbyleagueproject.org
Pierre Lacaze international rugby union stats at ESPN Scrum

1934 births
1995 deaths
France national rugby league team players
France international rugby union players
Dual-code rugby internationals
FC Lourdes players
French rugby union players
Lézignan Sangliers players
Racing 92 players
Toulouse Olympique players
French rugby league players
Sportspeople from Pyrénées-Atlantiques
People from Béarn
XIII Catalan players
Rugby league fullbacks
Rugby union fullbacks